The Ireland men's cricket team is touring Bangladesh in March and April 2023 to play one Test, three One Day International (ODI) and three Twenty20 International (T20I) matches.

This will be the first-ever Test Match played between the two sides, and the first multi-format series the two sides played at senior level. The Test match will be only the fourth men's Test in Ireland's history, and their first since July 2019. 

The fixtures were confirmed by Cricket Ireland (CI) in January 2023. Ahead of the ODI series, Ireland played a 50-over warm up match against a Bangladesh Cricket Board XI (BCB XI) side.

Squads

Former Zimbabwe wicket-keeper PJ Moor was included in Ireland's Test squad for the first time. On 9 March 2023, Ireland's Fionn Hand was added to the Test squad, replaced Josh Little in the ODI squad and replaced Conor Olphert (unavailable due to study commitments) in the T20I squad. On 11 March 2023, Ireland's Barry McCarthy was ruled out of entire tour, with Thomas Mayes named as his replacement. On 16 March 2023, Zakir Hasan was ruled out of the ODI series due to a finger injury, with Rony Talukdar named as his replacement.

Tour match

ODI series

1st ODI

2nd ODI

3rd ODI

T20I series

1st T20I

2nd T20I

3rd T20I

Only Test

References

External links
 Series home at ESPNcricinfo

2023 in Bangladeshi cricket
2023 in Irish cricket
International cricket tours of Bangladesh
Irish cricket tours abroad
International cricket competitions in 2022–23